The 1957 season of the Venezuelan Primera División, the top category of Venezuelan football, was played by 6 teams. The national champions were Universidad Central.

Results

Standings

External links
Venezuela 1957 season at RSSSF

Ven
Venezuelan Primera División seasons
1957 in Venezuelan sport